HMS Rippon was a 74-gun third rate ship of the line of the Royal Navy, launched on 8 August 1812 at Bursledon. She was broken up in 1821.

Career
There she captured two Swedish ships before a gale on 16 October took away her main and mizzen mast. Two days later , Commander Colin Macdonald, captain, encountered her 60 leagues west of Ushant, making her way towards Brest under jury main and mizzen masts. Rather than engage her and risk being crippled and so unable to follow her given the weather, Macdonald decided to follow her.

Fortuitously, on 20 October, Commander J.J. Gordon Bremer, captain, arrived and Macdonald and Bremer decided to attack Weser. They engaged her for about an hour and a half before they had to withdraw to repair their rigging. At about this time a third British vessel, Rippon, Captain Christopher Cole, came up. Bremer joined Cole and informed him of the situation while Scylla remained with Weser.

The next morning, as Rippon and Royalist sailed towards Scylla to renew their attack, Weser sailed towards Rippon and struck, after first firing two broadsides towards Scylla. Scylla suffered only two men wounded in the entire engagement. Royalist suffered more heavily, having two men killed and nine wounded. Weser lost four men killed and 15 wounded.

Rippon took Wesers crew on board as prisoners and towed her into port. The Royal Navy took her into service as HMS Weser.

In 1814 Rippon sailed with troops to North America.

Fate
Rippon was paid off into Ordinary in August 1814. Two years later she was roofed over. She was broken up in March 1821.

Notable crew members
John Septimus Roe, midshipman

Notes

Citations

References

  

Ships of the line of the Royal Navy
Vengeur-class ships of the line
1812 ships
Ships built on the River Hamble